"Fool in Love with You" is a 1981 song by Jim Photoglo.  It is the title track of his second album and the first release from the LP, although it was his second single to chart.

"Fool in Love with You" is Photoglo's most successful song, reaching number 25 on the U.S. Billboard Hot 100 and number 23 on Cash Box.  It spent four months on the American charts.

The song was a bigger Adult Contemporary hit, reaching #11 in Canada and #12 U.S.

Chart history

Weekly charts

References

External links
  (Official video)

1981 songs
1981 singles
Jim Photoglo songs
Songs written by Jim Photoglo
20th Century Fox Records singles